Thorsager is a small town in Jutland, Denmark with a population of 1,309 (1 January 2022 census), located in Thorsager Parish, 6 km north of Rønde. The town lies in Syddjurs Municipality and lies in the Central Denmark Region.
Thorsager is especially known for its church, which is Jutland's only round church. It was built around 1200.

Name
Thorsager is Danish for "Thor's Acre" a reference to the Norse God Thor.

External links
Thorsager associa-tions (Danish)
Thorsager-Bregnet-Feldballe Parish (Danish)

References

Cities and towns in the Central Denmark Region
Syddjurs Municipality